Siahar is a village in Ludhiana district in the Indian state of Punjab. Siahar is the birthplace of Dhan Dhan Sri Hazur Sant baba Mihan Singh ji. Baba G is popular for its love for Guru Granth Sahib ji.

Siahar has a gurdwara dedicated to Guru Hargobind. According to Sikh tradition, the Guru passed through Siahar while traveling from Rare to Jagere. His horse fell sick and died there. A memorial tomb for the horse at the spot where it was buried exists near the gurdwara.

Demographics

Village has 7 pattis
Raju
Bhogi 
Allo
Mayia
lodhi
Hasna 
Boora

Education
Government Senior Secondary School 
Government Girls High School
Good Earth school
Guru Nanak Public School
Kidzee School 
★★★★★★★★★ ▶'''''''''Perfect Computer Institute of Education- Siahar
Visit here For: All computer Courses ( Basic Computer, Internet, Accounts, Desktop, Hardware, Software, Personality Development, etc.)] We Have also Internet café : Passport apply, Voter card Apply, Pan Card , Color Copy, Color Photo, Photo State, Resume/Biodata, Income Tax Return, Driving License, Mobile/Pin drive Print out, Scan, Email. Lamination, Printer Refill, High Security Number Plates, Aadhar Download & color Print, All Job form Online & Offline Apply, & many more work like that........

Banks
Two banks operate in Siahar:
Indian Overseas bank
Cooperative Bank

Facilities 
Telephone Exchange
Post Office
Electric Sub Station
Petrol Pump
Public Health Center 
Grain Market and gosal medical store
Play Ground
Gym
library

Economy
Siahar is known for manufacturing chaff cutter machines in all over INDIA. The three major firms are:Hans Agro Industries (Hans Toka)Binder Inder Toka machine Hargobind''' Agro Industries

References 

Villages in Ludhiana district
Cities and towns in Ludhiana district